Silk Stocking Sal is a 1924 American drama film directed by Tod Browning and starring Evelyn Brent.

Plot
As described in a review in a film magazine, member of an underworld gang Sal (Brent), while robbing a safe in a house, is surprised by the owner Bob Cooper (Ellis), who falls for her story and gives her enough money to go straight. She laughs at him, but her mother's sympathy makes an impression on her so she takes a job at Bob's office. Bob's partner is murdered, and Bob is convicted and sentenced, based upon circumstantial evidence, to death in the electric chair. Sal is so sure that Bull Reagan (Metcalfe), leader of a gang, is the murderer that she rejoins the gang. At the last minute, she taunts a confession out of him. Bob is saved and finds happiness with Sal.

Cast

Promotion
A theater in Waterloo, Iowa, reportedly handed out a pair of silk stockings as a promotion to viewers.

Preservation
With no prints of Silk Stocking Sal located in any film archives, it, as with most FBO films of the mid-1920s, is a lost film.

References

External links

1924 films
American silent feature films
American black-and-white films
1924 drama films
Films directed by Tod Browning
Lost American films
Silent American drama films
Film Booking Offices of America films
1924 lost films
Lost drama films
1920s American films
Films with screenplays by Richard Schayer